Bagan Myo Thu is a 2018 Burmese drama television series. It is based on the popular novel "Bagan Myo Thu" written by Mg Thein Saing. It aired on MRTV-4, from November 28 to December 25, 2018, on Mondays to Fridays at 19:00 for 20 episodes.

Cast

Main
Kyaw Thu as U Min Khaung
Daung as Mg Mg Gyi
May Myint Mo as Khin Saw Mu. Her name of previous life in Pagan Kingdom, was Saw Latt.
 Htoo Aung as Ko Ko Lwin
Nay Chi Shoon Lak as Goon Nu

Supporting
 Phone Shein Khant as Kan Kaung
 Mike Mike as Pae Law
 Ei Si Kway as Khun Cho
 Zaw Oo as father of Khin Saw Mu
 Khin Moht Moht Aye as aunt of Khin Saw Mu
 Kyu Kyu Thin as Ma Thay
 Chit Su as Tar Tee

Awards

References

Burmese television series
MRTV (TV network) original programming